Rudkhaneh-ye Qal'eh Chay (رودخانِۀ قَلعِه چای) is a river in northwest Iran.

It is located at 36° 57' 13"N and 47° 40' 09" E east of Zanjan, Iran.

References

Rivers of Zanjan Province